Lasianobia is a genus of moths of the family Noctuidae.

Species
 Lasianobia illauta L.Ronkay & Gyulai, 2006

References
 Natural History Museum Lepidoptera genus database
 Ronkay, L. & Gyulai, P. (2006). "New Noctuidae (Lepidoptera) species from Iran and Tibet." Esperiana Buchreihe zur Entomologie 12: 211-241.

Hadeninae